Marble Hornets (abbreviated MH) is an alternate reality game YouTube web series inspired by the Slender Man online mythos. The first video was posted on YouTube on June 20, 2009, following a post that its creator, Troy Wagner, created on the Something Awful forum the previous day. It was the first web-series to be created around the character, with the first episode premiering exactly 10 days after the appearance of the original images of Slender Man on the Something Awful forums, and the first Marble Hornets affiliated post being 9 days after the character’s creation.

To date, there are 92 videos on the main channel (87 entries). The series also has 38 accompanying videos from a side-channel, "totheark". These videos, as well as the eponymous "totheark", have been featured multiple times throughout the story. As of December 17th, 2022, the principal channel has over 113 million views, with over 600K subscribers. The cryptic side channel "totheark" has over 100K subscribers, and 15 million views. It was filmed in Tuscaloosa, Alabama, and other nearby areas. 

On August 3, 2015, a follow-up series titled Clear Lakes 44 was uploaded onto the Marble Hornets channel. In April 2016, Clear Lakes 44 was cancelled after the members of the creative team went their separate ways, as confirmed by Wagner. On October 16, 2016, a successor to Clear Lakes 44, titled ECKVA, was launched. On December 27, 2017, Wagner posted a new photo to his Twitter page, teasing a comic related to Marble Hornets slated for a 2018 release. The first issue released on February 25, 2019, with a total of six being slated for the series, with 5 main story comics, and a special "totheark" comic. Four have been released as of 2022, the latest being Issue 3.5: ToTheArk, published on December 13, 2021. The series is illustrated by Canadian artist Jackie Reynolds. 

In 2015, a film spinoff Always Watching: A Marble Hornets Story was released. Critical reception was overwhelmingly negative.

Plot

Season 1
The series follows Jay Merrick (Troy Wagner), a young man who attempts to find out what happened during the filming of Marble Hornets, an unfinished student film project helmed by his friend, Alex Kralie (Joseph DeLage). Alex had abruptly ended the project after only three months of production, whereafter he left the tapes of raw footage with Jay, cut contact with him, and transferred schools.

Three years later, Jay decides to watch the tapes, and uploads them to YouTube in the form of "Entries". Through the footage, he discovers that the filming of Marble Hornets was hampered by the menacing presence of a humanoid figure known as "The Operator". The Operator appears to have constantly stalked Alex, including while he was on set with his actors, walking his dog to the park, and at his own home. Alex's physical and mental state became severely affected by The Operator’s presence, causing him to develop coughing fits and severe paranoia. As a result of the paranoia, Alex became more stressed, irritable, and aggressive towards cast members Tim Wright (Tim Sutton), Sarah Reid (Mary Kathleen Bishop) and camera operator Seth Wilson (Seth McCay).

Jay discovers that Alex began to constantly film himself with the hope of catching The Operator on camera. Jay also finds that Alex’s tapes have severe periodic audio and visual problems such as static, distortion, missing footage, and occasionally missing or inaudible audio. He speculates that Alex may be responsible for some of these problems.

After Jay becomes more involved with the case, The Operator begins invading Jay’s personal life. In response, Jay also sets up constant video surveillance in his home and begins posting the recordings to YouTube alongside the Entries from Alex's tapes, which often net cryptic and threatening responses from a mysterious user named "totheark", who posts videos with cryptic ciphers or messages, and utilizes the 'video reply" feature to try and get Jay's attention.

Jay meets with Tim to seek answers about Alex’s disappearance, before visiting the abandoned house of another cast member, Brian Thomas (Brian Haight). Jay finds Brian’s home vacant, in severe disrepair, and without functioning lighting. Upon further investigation, Jay finds an empty closet with a blanket and water bottle on the floor, as well as a trail of blood upstairs leading a sink full of dried blood in the bathroom.

Throughout his exploration of the house, Jay repeatedly hears unexplainable noises and briefly has a severe coughing fit. He finds and takes with him several items of interest including a bullet casing, pill bottle, and several of Alex's cryptic drawings. 

In a response video, totheark reveals that they were responsible for the noises Jay heard while investigating Brian’s house and that they were watching Jay the whole time. Jay then uploads 'Entry #17', which is footage of himself, Alex, and Tim filming a scene from Marble Hornets, where The Operator is seen watching the men through a window. Jay notes that he finds the events in the footage disturbing as he has no memory of them ever happening.

As a response to 'Entry #17', totheark uploads a video telling Jay to come back to Brian's decrepit house. Jay decides to go back to the house both due to totheark's response, and to continue his investigation. At the house, he has a brutal encounter with 'The Masked Man', who tackles Jay to the ground. After the attack, The Masked Man, unofficially dubbed as 'Masky' by the fandom, has a seizure. Jay wakes up the next day in his car, the knife he brought to the house now missing.

In 'Entry #19', Jay reveals that, like Alex, he has been filming himself  constantly and uploading the footage to a hard drive, but has found nothing of importance. The actual footage of 'Entry #19' shows The Masked Man breaking into Jay's home and watching him sleep, before he and Jay both disappear for multiple hours. After Jay shares this entry, totheark posts a response video wherein they show where Jay was during those missing hours.

In 'Entry #19.5', Jay analyzes the items he found during his first visit to Brian's house. He finds that the pill bottle he had taken is now empty, though it was full when he found it. He also finds that bullet casing he had taken is missing. Jay suspects that The Masked Man is behind this. Jay then reviews Alex's drawings and finds a message that mentions a tower written on the back of one page.

Jay visits the park where some filming from Marble Hornets took place, and finds a hidden tape in a red tower there. Footage on the tape shows Alex leaving Seth to die in an abandoned building after being attacked by The Operator. In a later clip on the tape, Alex states that all of the cast and crew of Marble Hornets are "gone". Jay attempts to return to Brian's house for any other possible clues, but is attacked and chased by The Masked Man. This ends with Jay being teleported to the place where Seth died, and Jay being attacked by The Operator, which breaks his camera and causes Jay to quit. He uploads his final bit of footage of some weird stuff happening within his apartment, primarily him disappearing for multiple hours after stepping through a doorway. Totheark hacks the Marble Hornets channel, and threatens Jay in a video featuring The Masked Man, telling him that this is no longer a game for them, and that they will be coming for him.

Totheark's threat causes Jay to flee his house and reside at nearby hotels. At one of these hotels, he finds out on the news that his apartment burned down shortly after he had fled. When trying to leave his current hiding spot, Jay receives a tape at his door that contains footage of Alex and his girlfriend, Amy Walters (Bethann Williams), at Amy’s home. The Operator appears in the tape, causing Amy and Alex to run. Jay uploads this tape as 'Entry #26', claiming that he will find Alex.

Season 2
Seven months after 'Entry #26' is posted to YouTube, an amnesiac Jay wakes up in a hotel room in an unknown location, with a chest-mounted camera. He learns that he was initially only booked for one night in the hotel, but decides to stay longer to get his bearings and gain information about the hotel and its surrounding area.

At the hotel, Jay encounters a young woman, Jessica Locke (Jessica May), who is initially very curious and inquisitive about him. Jay realizes that Jessica is the only other guest he has seen at the hotel and becomes suspicious of her after hearing strange noises coming from her room. In a later conversation with Jessica, Jay is caught in a lie about why he is staying at the hotel, causing Jessica to grow suspicious of Jay. 

In another conversation with Jessica, she asks Jay whether he is feeling alright and if he is experiencing any memory loss. When Jay lies and denies any strange experiences, Jessica reveals that she also woke up in the hotel with missing memories. Jay realizes that he and Jessica are having similar experiences and encourages her to gather her belongings so that they can leave the hotel together.

Jay enters Jessica’s room while he thinks she is preparing to leave, only to find the room empty. He discovers a slip of paper with a combination on it. Jay uses the combination to unlock the safe in his hotel room, where he finds a large amount of video tapes and a hard drive. When Jay opens the safe, The Masked Man runs into the room and attempts to attack him. Jay knocks him down with a flashlight, and escapes the hotel with all of the tapes and the hard drive in it, leaving Jessica behind. The tapes and hard drive in the safe are revealed to contain footage that details the events of the previous seven months that Jay has no memory of.

In the first few tapes that Jay watches, he goes to the return address shown on the package he received in 'Entry #26". The first trip is unsuccessful, but when he goes back a second time, he has a run-in with Alex for the first time in nearly 4 years. They explore the area a bit, before they are attacked by The Masked Man. They wrestle him to the ground and unmask him, discovering he is Tim, one of the core actors in Marble Hornets. Alex breaks Tim's leg with a rock. Jay and Alex meet up to discuss everything, and they form an alliance to try and find Amy, who has gone missing following the attack in 'Entry #26".

Alex later calls Jay and tells him to meet up the next day at Rosswood Park, an area near the hotel that Jay awoke in at the start of the season. While Jay is sleeping in his car, a hooded figure passes by his car with a camera, later confirmed to be totheark.

Jay goes to Rosswood Park, and decides to walk through the woods while waiting on Alex. During this time, Jay is attacked by The Operator, and he drops his camera while fleeing. The camera is later picked up by someone wearing a black mask and beige hoodie, known as The Hooded Man, or by the fandom, 'Hoody'. He returns the camera to Jay's car. 

Jay looks through the hard drive to see if anything is on it. He discovers it belonged to Alex, and he finds footage taken simultaneously to when the camera was rescued by The Hooded Man. In another tape, Alex meets with Jay in the forest, and Alex responds negatively after Jay says he doesn't want to look for Amy at that moment.

The two go to the house where Amy disappeared. While they're talking, Alex calls Amy's roommate, who turns out to be Jessica. Jay learns that Jessica was unintentionally dragged into the situation, instead of just being a bystander who was experiencing the same effects.

While looking more on the hard drive, it becomes apparent that Alex lied to Jessica about finding Amy, and had also been frequently visited by The Operator, the two seemingly in some sort of alliance as well. In one of the hard drive files Alex notices The Hooded Man outside of his house, and chases after him. The Hooded Man leads him to a forest, where Alex is jumped by both Tim and The Hooded Man, but before they kill him, the two suddenly run off.

In the next tape, Jay breaks into Alex's home due to his distrust of him, but Alex catches him. They argue before Jay notices that The Operator is inside the home right behind them, and Jay runs off. Alex, however, stays. The two meet at a parking lot where they have an argument and quit working together. Jay forces Alex to give him Jessica's phone number. Jay calls Jessica to ask her about where Amy is, in the process realizing that Alex had been lying to Jessica. This causes Jay to begin stalking Alex.

The tapes show Jay watching Alex visit Rosswood Park regularly, but he doesn't follow him into the forest for most of the visits. On one occasion Jay follows Alex in, but runs away when he thinks Alex notices him. The footage from Alex's body camera shows him bludgeoning a stranger to death with a rock after mistaking them for Jay. After Alex kills the man, The Operator appears and seemingly removes the body from the premises. 

A while later, Jay breaks into Alex's home again while he isn't there, and steals a tape from him. This tape shows footage of when Marble Hornets was in production. On the tape, Alex and Brian go to an abandoned hospital to film some scenes. While there, they are attacked by The Operator, and Alex disappears. Brian picks up Alex's camera and begins searching for him, but instead he finds Tim laying on the floor of a room in a coughing fit. Once again Brian is attacked by The Operator, and the last bit of footage shows Brian's body being dragged away by Alex.

The last tape shows Alex luring Jay and Jessica into the woods at the park under the guise of showing them something related to Amy's disappearance. After leading them onto the upper floor of an abandoned structure, Alex holds the two at gunpoint. He reveals that he is aware of Jay’s stalking and is preparing to shoot them when he is attacked and subdued by Tim. Jay and Jessica escape and book rooms at a hotel, where they suffer an attack by The Operator and sustain memory loss as a result. Jay concludes after seeing all of this footage that he shouldn't trust Alex, but he still wants to find him. While downtown, Jay sees Tim outside of an antique shop. Jay tells the viewers he will keep them updated, and that he has a plan.

Season 3
With no leads in finding either Alex or Jessica, Jay tries to track down Tim and is eventually able to meet up with him. When they do, Tim remembers nothing of Jay, other than the movie. So, Jay tells him he wants to meet up with Tim under the pretense of finishing Marble Hornets. 

A little while later, Tim calls Jay, saying that he remembers shooting behind the scenes footage for the movie, and that he will give Jay the tapes if he can find them. The next time they meet up, Tim gives Jay the aforementioned BTS tapes. The first tape Jay watches shows Alex, Tim and Brian at Tim's house, where they plan on making the soundtrack for the movie. The power goes out, and while Tim is looking for the breaker box in the darkness, The Operator appears. Tim, however, doesn't notice. When Tim comes back to the group, The Operator walks into the room, and presumably attacks them.

Most of the other tapes contain general BTS footage, but in one of them, Tim mentions there being an abandoned hospital where they can film. One of the last tapes shows Tim and Alex going to the hospital. While there, Alex sees an annex, and wants to go there instead. When Tim refuses to go to the annex, Alex becomes aggressive towards him, but still agrees to explore the hospital. When Tim leaves to go use the restroom, Alex picks up a pipe and knocks him out. The camera falls from where it had been put down and The Operator is seen.

The last tape picks up the same night, when Tim wakes up and explores the abandoned building in complete darkness. He escapes, but instead of going home, he goes to the annex. While hiding there, he spots Alex with another pipe, but Alex doesn't find him. Tim suffers another coughing fit, a frame of The Operator appears, and the camera glitches out. Jay notes that the annex is identical to the hospital in Season 2, where Brian was attacked.

A few days after, Jay and Tim meet up once again and decide to go to the hospital per Jay's suggestion of scouting out abandoned buildings for filming locations. When they arrive, Jay backs out and wants to go to the annex instead. Tim agrees unwillingly. While exploring, they hear debris falling, which makes Jay increasingly paranoid. While Jay and Tim are having an argument about the movie, they encounter The Hooded Man. Jay chases after him, but loses The Hooded Man near a maintenance tunnel in an adjoining building. Tim convinces Jay to not go into the tunnel, and they leave.

A few nights after the exploration, Tim calls Jay, saying that they need to talk. When they meet up, Tim punches Jay in the face, furious at him. He tells him that he found the Marble Hornets YouTube account, and that he knows Jay's true intentions. He blames Jay for everything that has happened, saying that he was getting better before Jay met with him. He yells at him for uploading all footage of him as The Masked Man, claiming that it was all Alex's and The Operator's fault for him being that way. The argument ends with Tim saying he wants nothing to do with Jay anymore.

Totheark uploads a video response, entitled 'Reference', which is shot inside of the maintenance tunnel with the audio being distorted clips of Tim yelling at Jay. The Masked Man's mask appears in the darkness, and the text "TRUTH WITH LIGHT' appears, with the code 'LIES IN DARK'. The video drives Jay to return to the maintenance tunnel by himself, as he has a hunch that The Hooded Man led him there for a specific purpose. While in the annex next to the tunnel, he finds a message written from The Hooded Man, which says "HE IS A LIAR. FOLLOW ME."

While exploring in the tunnel, he finds a long-legged doll, which was last seen in Season 1, where The Masked Man first attacked Jay. Beside the doll is a folder with the text 'LIAR' on it. On further inspection, the folder has medical documents about Tim. When Jay tries to escape, he is attacked by The Operator, but he manages to get out with everything.

Jay uploads 'Entry #60.5', an analysis video of everything inside of the folder. The folder contains several of Tim's old medical records, which reveal that he suffers from seizures, a history with headaches, insomnia, depression, and many other things. A picture was also left in the folder of Tim and Jay arguing, with the text "WATCHING" written on it. Jay decides to take a break, due to being at a dead-end.

Totheark uploads 'observation', which contains footage of The Hooded Man stalking outside of Tim's home. A few days after this, Jay uploads 'Entry #61', which contains footage someone else had uploaded to the channel a few hours beforehand. The aforementioned footage shows The Hooded Man breaking into Tim's house and stealing his medication, causing Tim to have a psychological breakdown. Afterwards, Tim slowly limps his way out of the room, and text on the footage from The Hooded Man tells Jay that this is his fault, and that Tim has gone somewhere.

Jay goes to Rosswood Park, where he thinks Tim might be. While exploring, Jay encounters Tim in his masked state. Tim chases Jay for a while, until Jay finds a hiding spot, where he is found shortly afterwards. Tim drags Jay away, and The Hooded Man picks up the camera. The screen distorts, and the footage jumps to the next morning, where Jay and Tim wake up in a decrepit shack in Rosswood.

Totheark uploads 'Isolation', where The Hooded Man tells Jay and Tim to 'meet again soon'. Jay and Tim do indeed meet up in the next entry, and discuss everything. They form an alliance under one condition: they'll work together to deal with Alex, so long as they find Jessica afterward.

Tim and Jay head back to Rosswood Park, with Tim wearing the chest-mounted camera. Tim confirms to Jay that he does not remember anything while in his masked state. After not being able to find the shack they had woken up in, they decide to investigate the tunnel from Season 2, where Alex killed a man. While in the tunnel, Jay gets a call from Alex, telling him to leave. Tim falls to the ground in a coughing fit, and The Operator attacks them. Jay is unable to drag Tim away, and leaves him behind. When Jay makes it back to the parking lot, Tim is somehow already in his car, and he drives away without speaking to Jay.

The next Entry is from Tim's chest-camera footage. After Jay leaves Tim, Tim is teleported to multiple places, including a seemingly endless body of water where he isn't able to come up and breath, a forest, hanging upside down from trees, a concrete world where he finds the body of the man whom Alex killed. After Tim somehow manages to escape, he is teleported into his car and, seemingly in a dazed state, drives to the annex. While there, Tim suffers schizophrenic and psychological breakdowns. In an attempt to stop his breakdowns, Tim attempts to overdose on his medication. He passes out after finding the message on the wall from The Hooded Man calling him a liar.

The next morning, Tim and Jay meet up. Tim gives Jay the chest-camera, and asks Jay if they can go to the annex for one last time, to discuss things. While there, Tim reveals that he was formerly committed to the mental hospital when he was a kid due to hallucinations that he fears were caused by The Operator. He also fears that he's the reason why The Operator sickness and attacks spread to everyone on the filmset of Marble Hornets.

Jay and Tim search the annex for any remaining information before they leave the hospital for good. While searching, they encounter The Hooded Man, but he doesn't see them. Tim and Jay trail him, and see him go into one of the rooms of the building and check on something before disappearing into the forest.

Jay discovers the thing that The Hooded Man left was a tape, which showcases the aftermath of Tim passing out in the annex due to the pills. The Hooded Man had dragged Tim out of the building before beginning to trail Alex, who had shown up at the annex. The Hooded Man eventually knocks Alex out with a pipe and ties him to a chair. Tim, who had since woken up, and presumably in his masked state, beats Alex up to the point of him being on the brink of unconsciousness. The Hooded Man searches Alex's pockets and finds his gun, but The Operator appears before The Hooded Man is able to shoot Alex.  

A few days later, Jay and Tim head out to drive to the old filming locations for Marble Hornets to see if they can find any clues left there. While at the red tower from Season 1, Jay claims to see someone watching them, although Tim does not see anyone and no one is captured on camera. While leaving, they find burned tapes left in a sink hole. Later, Jay is able to get two of the tapes to work. The first tape reveals that Alex had been planning to transfer to the school that Amy was attending. It also shows him encountering and trying to tackle The Operator - much in the same way Jay did in Season 2. The second tape shows that after giving Jay the Marble Hornets tapes in 2006, Alex had tried to attack him. Jay does not remember being attacked and begins to doubt his memory. 

Jay and Tim go to Alex's old house, where Jay had been attacked. Jay thinks he sees the Operator outside a window, but again Tim doesn't see anything and nothing appears on camera. Tim tells Jay they should get him evaluated, but Jay refuses, telling Tim he's fine. While investigating the basement, the two realize it's now dark outside, and The Operator appears and attacks them. They make it outside, but Tim is transported about 100 yards away from Jay, who is now suffering from a seizure in front of the house. When Tim makes it back to Jay, The Operator attacks Tim, but he stands up to him. After Tim stands up to him, The Operator disappears, and Jay and Tim make it back to the car, with Jay seemingly in a permanent dazed state.

While hiding out in a hotel, The Hooded Man uploads footage onto the YouTube account, showing him running out of the stolen pills. He breaks into Tim's house to get more, and takes some spare pills from Tim's bathroom. He also finds a tape in Tim's living room, but before he can take it the attic door opens and Alex begins coming down the steps. The Hooded Man escapes the house without being caught.

Back at the hotel, Tim and Jay have a discussion about what Jay doesn't remember, and Tim assumes that the reason The Operator backed away was because of Tim's medication, which Tim had been giving to Jay. Jay is angry about this and tells Tim and he doesn't want any more of his medication. The two decide to return to Tim's house, as Tim is running low on pills and he doesn't want Alex in his house.

When they return to Tim's house, Alex is gone. They find a sleeping bag in the attic, with a photo of Amy nearby. Some writing on the back of the photo implies that The Hooded Man had kidnapped Alex and brought him to another address. Tim finds the tape that was shown by The Hooded Man, and hides it from Jay. Jay, who realizes what Tim is doing, steals the tape back. Tim tells him that he shouldn't watch the tape yet, but Jay runs away and watches it anyway.  

The tape shows that Tim (in his masked state) and The Hooded Man are the ones responsible for Jessica's disappearance in Season 2. They brought Jessica into the woods, and Tim went back to the hotel to attempt to get Jay. Jessica and The Hooded Man encounter Alex, who shoots but does not hit The Hooded Man. Alex, pretending to be an ally, leads Jessica to the tunnel where he then attempts to kill her. She is able to steal the gun from him, and the Hooded Man arrives and beats up Alex. Jessica runs into the woods to hide and encounters The Operator, who attacks her.  

Jay goes back to Tim's house with a knife and zip ties. Tim gets the jump on him and ties him up with Jay's zip-ties and takes his knife and camera. Tim tells him that he's going to the address on the back of the Amy photo, a college campus, without Jay. While gone, The Hooded Man enters Tim's home and gives Jay a knife to free himself and a camera.  

Both Jay and Tim go to the college campus on their own. Jay runs into The Hooded Man but loses him. He follows Tim into a basement, where he finds hostage photos of Alex, and a note saying that Alex has been moved to one of the buildings, Benedict Hall. Jay is unable to get into the building, with all the entrances locked, so he settles in a neighboring building to keep a watch on Benedict Hall. The next morning, Jay sees Tim run out of Benedict Hall. He goes into the building to explore, but is found and shot by Alex, fatally wounding him. Jay escapes and sits down in a random room, and is taken by The Operator. 

Tim, now on his own, finds Jay's car and takes his laptop, which he finds a mysterious video file on. It shows Jay the day after getting the Jessica tape, exploring Rosswood Park to retrace Alex and Jessica's steps. Jay calls Tim and tells him he is sorry, and that he wants to work together again, before being attacked by The Operator. Tim notes that he never received that call, and that the Operator attack must have changed Jay from an apologetic to violent state.

While at the college, Tim runs into The Hooded Man, who taunts him with pills and his mask, before both of them are attacked by The Operator. The two are teleported to multiple places, all while Tim chases the Hooded Man. Tim is teleported to his house, where he sees Jay's dead body surrounded by papers covered with the operator symbol and text saying "your fault". Tim and The Hooded Man are teleported back to the college, where The Hooded Man knocks Tim down. He attempts to hide under a window seal, but Tim grabs a pipe and puts it in the air, which scares The Hooded Man, and causes him to fall down to the ground, killing him.

Tim gets a tape and a bottle of pills from The Hooded Man's dead body, but the Operator shows up before Tim can unmask him. The tape shows Alex's Marble Hornets audition tape. Brian arrives with Tim, and they try out for the movie. The hoodie that Brian wears is the same one that The Hooded Man wore, confirming to Tim that Brian had been totheark.

Tim, realizing all of the deaths are in someway Alex's fault, attempts to lure him to his home. Alex shows up and begins pouring accelerant throughout the house, verbally berating a hidden Tim all the while. Alex tells Tim "if you want to settle this, you know where I'll be" before setting fire to the house. 

Tim returns to Benedict Hall to confront Alex. The two are teleported multiple places as Alex reveals that he wants to kill anyone who has ever come into contact with The Operator, as he believes this will prevent the spread of The Operator's influence. He also reveals that he has already killed Amy, Sarah, and Seth in addition to Jay, knows that Brian is dead, and believes that Jessica is also dead. Alex and Tim are the only remaining survivors of the recording of Marble Hornets, making Tim Alex's last remaining target, after which he intends to kill himself. In the ensuing struggle, Tim finally manages to kill Alex by stabbing him multiple times in the throat. Alex's final words to Tim are that if he knows of any others who have come into contact with the Operator, then he should kill them and then kill himself as Alex had intended to do.

Four days later, Tim disposes of his mask and reunites with Jessica, who had survived the Operator attack, unbeknownst to Alex. Tim had kept her hidden in order to protect her from any further danger. Jessica mentions that she is also on medication, and asks about Jay. Tim tells her that Jay has moved away. He also tells Jessica that he will be moving away from the area. Tim's final encounter with Jessica ends ambiguously; he lapses into a coughing fit as the camera distorts and then cuts to black. When the footage resumes, Tim is alone, driving away. He stops at an intersection, able to turn either left or right, while sirens can be heard in the distance. The footage cuts to a text card that simply states: "Everything is fine".

Characters

 Jay Merrick (Troy Wagner): The person behind the "Marble Hornets" channel and the primary protagonist of the series. After rediscovering tapes given to him by former friend Alex Kralie, Jay begins uploading entries in an attempt to discover exactly what happened during the filming of Alex's student film Marble Hornets. He is shot and mortally wounded by Alex in Entry #80. His body is used to taunt Tim by The Operator before finally having his body removed from this dimension.
 Timothy Wright / The Masked Man (Tim Sutton): A former actor from the Marble Hornets student film, he is the primary protagonist of season 3 of the series. He collaborates with Jay starting in Entry #59 and then becomes leader of the "Marble Hornets" channel following Jay's death in Entry #80 until the series' conclusion in Entry #87. He makes several appearances in the Entries and on the Totheark channel wearing a mask and he is unveiled as the masked man in Entry #35. The Masked Man makes his first appearance in Brian's house during Jay's investigations in Entry #18. It is suggested that Tim is under the influence of The Operator during the times he wears his mask, as backed up in his monologue to Jay in Entry #59. It is also suggested that Tim is the cause for The Operators appearance in everyone's lives, due to his history with Operator induced hallucinations and memory loss in his youth Tim is one of the two remaining alive characters, other than Jessica based on Entry #87, the last entry uploaded. 
 Alex Kralie (Joseph DeLage): The director of the original Marble Hornets student film project and one of the series' primary antagonists. Alex used to attend the same school as Jay, but transferred to a different one following the wrap on filming of Marble Hornets. A large portion of Season 1 consists of tapes he filmed for personal use and for his uncompleted student film Marble Hornets. In Entry 86 he reveals that he killed Sarah Reid, Seth Wilson and Amy Walters. He is stabbed and killed by Tim in Entry #86.
 Brian Thomas / The Hooded Man (Brian Haight): Brian was the lead actor in Alex Kralie's project and serves as the series' second antagonist. He appears throughout most of the Entries and on the Totheark channel as a hooded figure who works against Alex. He falls to his death during a confrontation with Tim in Entry #83.
 Seth Wilson (Seth McCay): The cameraman for Alex's film, Marble Hornets. Alex leads him to The Operator at the abandoned building in Entry #22 in an attempt to sacrifice him to The Operator. Alex confirms that he has killed him in Entry #86.
 Sarah Reid (Mary Kathleen Bishop): An actress from Marble Hornets. She appears in front of the camera only once in Entry #9. Alex confirms that he has killed her in Entry #86.
 Amy Walters (Bethann Williams): Alex's girlfriend. She appears in front of the camera only once in Entry #26, after Jay receives a package with a video tape of her and Alex being attacked by The Operator. Alex confirms that he has killed her in Entry #86.
 Jessica Locke (Jessica May ): A woman who Jay meets in the second season of the series. She is somehow connected to Jay as she has an adjoining room with him in the hotel, and consequently is somehow connected to Alex and The Operator. It is later revealed that she is the friend and roommate of Amy, hence her involvement. Alex believes her to be dead prior to his own death in Entry #86, but she is revealed to still be alive in Entry #87. Jessica is the main character of the Marble Hornets comic sequel, where she now works as a delivery driver in Rosswood Park while still haunted by her experiences with the Operator. She is one of only two human characters (along with Tim) that survived the events of the series.
Totheark: An anonymous figure who makes cryptic video responses to the Entries throughout the series. Their identity is never revealed throughout the series and it is entirely possible that it could be a group of people, as opposed to an individual. It is popularly believed that Brian, Tim (in his masked state), or Seth may have been owners or co-owners of the account.
The Operator: An entity of unknown origin who begins appearing to Alex during the shooting of Marble Hornets, and one of the series' primary antagonists. When Jay personally investigates Alex's disappearance, he starts to encounter The Operator as well. It is later revealed that Tim was the first person associated with Marble Hornets to have come into contact with The Operator, and thus the Operator's contact with other characters may have occurred via him. The Operator displays the ability to teleport or otherwise move in a logically inconsistent manner, to move people in a similar way, and inflict permanent amnesiac states in people. While the Operator rarely physically threatens the cast at any point, its presence is shown to have a harmful effect on the human body and psyche, causing the various hallucinations and fugue states of the characters. Repeated exposure to the Operator is associated with a hard, painful coughing sickness. There is no indication as to the intent or goals of the Operator.

Episodes

Season 1 (2009–10)

Season 2 (2010–11)

Season 3 (2012–14)

Development and reception

Wagner and DeLage began working on the webseries after reading about the Slender Man mythos and because both liked the ease of creating a YouTube series. The initial budget for the series was about $500, which the two used to create the first 26 episodes. They decided against making a set time for each entry, as they both determined that the characters filming the entries would not consider the length of the episode and that the random entry times would help add to the realism. The entire series was edited with the software Sony Vegas Pro and Adobe Premiere.

After its release the series' popularity grew, drawing comparisons to Lonelygirl15 and iChannel. In 2013, Dread Central named Marble Hornets one of their "Top 10 Horror Fan Films", noting that while it "isn’t technically a film" it still contained an "interwoven examination of the mythical Slender Man" and that they felt it was "what quality fanfare and found footage is really all about." Early during the airing of season 1, the series received praise from Roger Ebert.

In May 2014, the developers launched a Kickstarter campaign to raise funds for the DVD release of the third season. The response was overwhelmingly positive, with the original goal of $8000 in donations being exceeded by $76,271. These funds went towards further projects, including a box set and new supplementary material in the form of scenes from Alex Kralie's Marble Hornets.

Film adaptation

In February 2013, Variety announced that plans were underway to produce a film adaptation of Marble Hornets. They also announced that the script would be written by Ian Shorr, that James Moran would direct, and that Doug Jones would be portraying the Operator in the film. In October of the same year, Wagner announced on his blog that the movie had finished filming and it would not be a continuation of the YouTube series but would be set within the same universe.

The film, titled Always Watching: A Marble Hornets Story, was released on video on demand on April 7, 2015, starring Doug Jones, Alexandra Breckenridge, and Alexandra Holden. The film opened in select theaters on May 15, 2015. Critical reception for Always Watching was predominantly negative.

References

External links
 
 
 

YouTube original programming
American web series
Alabama in fiction
Horror fiction web series
2009 web series debuts
Slender Man
Works based on Internet-based works
2014 web series endings